Sili Epa Tuioti is a Samoan politician and Cabinet Minister. He is a member of the Human Rights Protection Party.

Tuioti studied for two years at Rhema Bible Training school. He is a former career public servant who served as Head of Treasury from 1991 to 1999. He later worked as a consultant. He was first elected to the  Legislative Assembly of Samoa at the 2016 Samoan general election, and appointed Minister of Finance.

Tuioti lost his seat in the April 2021 Samoan general election.

References

Members of the Legislative Assembly of Samoa
Living people
Government ministers of Samoa
Finance ministers of Samoa
Human Rights Protection Party politicians
Year of birth missing (living people)